Swarnakumari Devi (1855 or 1856 – 1932), also known as Swarnakumari Tagore, Swarnakumari Ghosal, Svarṇakumārī Debī and Srimati Svarna Kumari Devi, was an Indian Bengali writer, editor, essayist, poet, novelist, playwright, composer, and social worker.

Biography
Swarnakumari was born as the tenth child to Maharshi Debendranath Tagore and Sarada Devi into the Tagore family of Jorasanko, Kolkata in 1855 or 1856. She was the elder sister of Rabindranath Tagore. Her short story Mutiny describes her experience being born just prior to the Sepoy Rebellion of 1857.

Swarnakumari and her sisters did not attend school, but were tutored privately in Sanskrit and English and had the educational benefit of being raised in the Calcutta mansion that was home to the Tagore family. At age 13, she married Janakinath Ghosal, a deputy magistrate. Their children were  Hiranmoyee Devi, Sir Jyotsnanath Ghosal and Sarala Devi Chaudhurani.

In 1886, she established the first women's organization in Bengal, Sakhi-Samiti, to help impoverished women. She also founded the Ladies' Theosophical Society in Calcutta.

She participated in sessions of the Indian National Congress in 1889 and 1890. Swarnakumari and Kadambini Ganguly were the first women delegates to the Indian National Congress.

Literary career
Swarnakumari was a writer and editor for the literary monthly Bharati for more than 30 years, after the journal was established by her older brother Dijendranath Tagore in 1877 or 1878. Her work in Bharati is considered to be among her major achievements.

Swarnakumari is the author of 25 books and a wide range of essays. 17 of her 24 essays on science were published in the journal Bharati between 1880 and 1889, and she expanded the Bengali language by creating new scientific terminology, as well as by incorporating terms created by Rajendralal Mitra, Madhusudan Gupta, Iswar Chandra Vidyasagar and Bankim Chandra Chattopadhyay. Her science essays were written for lay readers, to help facilitate understanding of the concepts and to help promote science education. In 1882, a collection of her science essays, titled Prithivi, was published.

According to Anurupa Devi, "Many women had written poems and stories before her, but these were looked upon patronizingly. She was the first writer to show up the strengths of women's writing and raise women's creations to a position of respect." Swarnakumari achieved contemporary popularity as a novelist, but many of her works have not been reprinted.

Her novel Dipnirban (The Snuffing Out of the Light) was first published anonymously in 1870, but it was eventually understood that the author was a "young Hindu lady", according to a notice in the Hindu Patriot. The Calcutta Review wrote, "We have no hesitation in pronouncing this book to be by far the best that has yet been written by a Bengali lady, and we should no more hesitate to call it one of the ablest in the whole literature of Bengal." In 1879, she published what is believed to be the first Opera written in Bengali, Basanta Utsav (Spring Festival). In her poem Likhitechi (Writing, Day and Night), she expresses frustration at the challenges related to establishing her own career as a writer.

Swarnakumari also wrote more than three hundred songs.

Selected works

Novels
 Dipnirban (The Snuffing Out of the Light), 1870	 		
 Mibar Raj, 1877	
 Chinna Mukul (A Picked Flower), 1879	
 Mālati, 1881
 Hughlir Imam Badi 1887
 Vidroha (Revolt), 1890
 Snehalata ba Palita (tr. as: The Uprooted Vine), (two volumes) 1892 and 1893, Oxford University Press, 2004 
 Phulermala (tr. as: The fatal Garland), 1894
 Kahake (To Whom?; tr. as: The Unfinished Song), 1898, Oxford University Press, 2008 
 Bichitra, 1920
 Swapnabani, 1921
 Milanrati, 1925
 Phuler Mala

Short stories
 Short stories, 1919

Plays
 Koney Badal (Evening Dust Clouds / Time for Seeing the Bride), 1906
 Pak Chakra (Wheel of Fortune), 1911
 Rajkanya
 Divyakamal

Honors and awards 
She received the Jagattarini gold medal in 1927 from the University of Calcutta and was the first woman to win this award. She was the president of the Vangiya Sahitya Sammelan (Vangiya literary conference) in 1929.

Death and legacy
She died in 1932 in Kolkata. She has been recognized by the Indian History Congress as one of the first women from Bengal to achieve success as a writer and for her efforts to encourage scientific education, including among women.

See also 
 Tagore family
 List of Bengali-language authors (alphabetical)

References 
Citations

Sources

Further reading
 Caṭṭopādhyāẏa, Mīnā. Svarṇakumārī Debī, Anubhāba, Kalakātā, 2000. 
 Majumadāra, Samareśa. Svarṇakumārī Debīra galpa, Ratnabalī: Prāptisthāna, Pustaka Bipaṇi, Kalakātā, 2004. 
 Ghose, Sudakshina. Swarnakumari Devi. Translated into English by Tapati Chowdhurie, Sahitya Akademi, Kolkata, 2008.

1855 births
1932 deaths
19th-century Bengali poets
20th-century Bengali poets
19th-century Indian poets
20th-century Indian poets
19th-century Indian musicians
20th-century Indian musicians
19th-century Indian composers
20th-century Indian composers
19th-century Indian dramatists and playwrights
20th-century Indian dramatists and playwrights
19th-century Indian essayists
20th-century Indian essayists
19th-century Indian novelists
Bengali Hindus
Bengali writers
Bengali-language poets
Bengali female poets
Indian Hindus
Indian dramatists and playwrights
Indian essayists
Indian social reformers
Indian poets
Musicians from Kolkata
Poets from West Bengal
Women writers from West Bengal
Writers from Kolkata
Indian social workers
Indian educators
19th-century Indian educators
20th-century Indian educators
Indian women educators
Indian educational theorists
Indian women educational theorists
19th-century Indian educational theorists
20th-century Indian educational theorists
Educationists from India
Indian writers
19th-century Indian writers
19th-century Indian women writers
20th-century Indian writers
20th-century Indian women writers
Indian editors
Indian women editors
Indian academics
Indian magazine editors
Indian scholars
Indian women scholars
20th-century Indian scholars
19th-century Indian scholars
Indian women activists
Indian activists